Big Top is a circus-themed platform game for the IBM PC family of computers, written by Michael Abrash and published by Funtastic in 1983. The game was distributed on a self-booting disk.

Gameplay

Big Top features a circus "big top" theme. The user plays the part of a clown with the job of gathering all the hats on each ladder-filled level—where, in keeping with the theme, levels are called rings. Each ring spans across at least two screens and has an upper and lower level. Obstacles include evil clowns, cannons, and rolling barrels.

Reception

See also
Sammy Lightfoot, a similarly-themed game also from 1983

References

External links
 Big Top blog entry at Bunny Abandonware

1983 video games
Funtastic games
Platform games
Single-player video games
Video games developed in the United States